Zhuzhou Television Tower is a  tall free standing telecommunications tower in Zhuzhou, China.
It is the ninth tallest tower in China, and the second tallest steel tower.
It features a revolving restaurant and open-air observation deck. It broadcasts five television and two radio channels.

History 
It was completed in 1999 after three years of construction. The cost of construction was over US$13 million.

The immediate vicinity of the tower has since been redeveloped as a tourist attraction and renamed "Shennong City", and as part of the project the tower was renamed the "Shennong Tower".

Some redevelopment was carried out in 2006 to improve fire safety and add a ballroom to the lobby.

See also 
 List of towers
 Lattice tower
 List of tallest freestanding steel structures

References

External links 
 

Towers completed in 1999
Observation towers in China
Communication towers in China
Zhuzhou
Buildings and structures in Hunan
Towers with revolving restaurants
1999 establishments in China
Lattice towers